Leslie Herbert Neal (12 September 1913 – 23 January 1990) was an Australian rules footballer who played with Footscray in the Victorian Football League (VFL). 

Neal enlisted shortly after his one senior game with Footscray, and served in the Royal Australian Air Force from 1942 to 1946.

Notes

External links 

1913 births
1990 deaths
Australian rules footballers from Victoria (Australia)
Western Bulldogs players
Yarraville Football Club players
People from Bairnsdale
Royal Australian Air Force personnel of World War II
Military personnel from Victoria (Australia)